Amminadab II ("my people are generous") was king of Ammon around 600 BCE. He was the son of King Hissalel of Ammon. He is mentioned on an inscription on a bottle unearthed at Tel Siran in Jordan, which inscription reads: 'mndb mlk bn'mn (Ammonite: 𐤏𐤌𐤍𐤃𐤁 𐤌𐤋𐤊 𐤁𐤍𐤏𐤌𐤍) / bn hsl'l mlk bn'mn (Ammonite: 𐤁𐤍 𐤄𐤔𐤋𐤀𐤋 𐤁𐤍𐤏𐤌𐤍) / bn'mndb mlk bn'mn (Ammonite: 𐤁𐤍𐤏𐤌𐤍𐤃𐤁 𐤌𐤋𐤊 𐤁𐤍𐤏𐤌𐤍)  "Amminadab [II] king of the Ammonites son of Hassal'il king of the Ammonites son of Amminadab [I] king of the Ammonites."

References

Kings of Ammon
7th-century BC people
6th-century BC people